Hubba Read (26 May 1908 – 1 March 2001) was an Australian cricketer. He played three first-class matches for Western Australia between 1938/39 and 1939/40.

See also
 List of Western Australia first-class cricketers

References

External links
 

1908 births
2001 deaths
Australian cricketers
Western Australia cricketers
Cricketers from Adelaide